Bus transport in France is provided at a flat-rate charge, with inner city services operate well out into the suburbs and the countryside. However, rural services are limited. In 2015 the French government introduced Macron's Law that has allowed bus operators to transport passengers on any routes.

Urban bus services
In most, if not all, French cities, urban bus services are provided at a flat-rate charge for individual journeys. Many cities have bus services that operate well out into the suburbs or even the country. Fares are normally cheap, but rural services can be limited, especially on weekends.

Inter-city buses
Trains have long had a monopoly on inter-regional buses, but in 2015 the French government introduced Macron's Law  that has allowed bus operators to transport passengers on any routes.

See also
RATP Bus Network
Transport in France

References 

 

fr:Lignes régulières d'autocar en France